Abdol Majid Mirza Eyn-ed-Dowleh (1845 – 2 November 1927) was a Persian Qajar prince and twice Prime Minister of Iran. He was the eldest son of Prince Soltan Ahmad Mirza Azod Al-Duleh and grandson of Fat'h Ali Shah Qajar.

Ein ad-Dowleh Mansion belonged to him.

References

1845 births
1927 deaths
People from Tehran
Prime Ministers of Iran
Qajar princes
People of the Persian Constitutional Revolution